Charlotte Schmit (born 17 January 2006) is a Luxembourger footballer who plays as a midfielder for Frauen-Bundesliga club Freiburg and the Luxembourg women's national team.

International career
Schmit made her senior debut for Luxembourg on 11 April 2021 during a 2–1 friendly win against Liechtenstein.

References

2006 births
Living people
Women's association football midfielders
Luxembourgian women's footballers
Luxembourg women's international footballers